The fourth and final season of the Fox television series Sleepy Hollow premiered on January 6, 2017, and concluded on March 31, 2017, and consisted of 13 episodes.

Cast and characters

Main cast
 Tom Mison as Ichabod Crane
 Janina Gavankar as Agent Diana Thomas
 Lyndie Greenwood as Jennifer "Jenny" Mills
 Jerry MacKinnon as Jake Wells
 Rachel Melvin as Alex Norwood
 Oona Yaffe as Molly Thomas
 Jeremy Davies as Malcolm Dreyfuss

Recurring cast
 Kamar de los Reyes as Jobe
 Robbie Kay as Logan MacDonald
 Seychelle Gabriel as Lara, an older incarnation of Molly from a dystopian future.

Guest cast

 John Noble as Henry Parrish / Jeremy Crane
 Edwin Hodge as Benjamin Banneker
 Jeremy Owens as the Headless Horseman
 Courtney Lakin as Marg Dyer
 Kelley Missal as Malligo Dyer 
 Sara Sanderson as Moll Dyer
 Griff Furst as Mr. Branson
 James Kyson as Diana's boss
 Alexander Ward as demon John Wilkes Booth / Sicarius Spei
 Adrian Bond as John Wilkes Booth
 John Zachary as Abraham Lincoln
 Karen Coles as Mary Todd Lincoln
 Mark Campbell as George Washington
 Eric Joshua Davis as John André
 Charmin Lee as Madame President
 Onira Tarés as Grace Dixon
 Marti Matulis as the Sphinx
 Bill Heck as Mitch Thomas / the Barghest
 Brent McGee as Captain William Bradford
Maggie Geha as a restaurant hostess

Episodes

Production

Casting

On July 22, 2016, it was announced that Janina Gavankar had joined the cast in a recurring role as Diana Thomas, Ichabod's new partner. Described as a single mom, and a former military officer who serves as a special agent for Homeland Security. Also cast in a recurring role is former MasterChef Junior contestant Oona Yaffe, who plays Diana's ten-year-old daughter Molly Thomas. Rachel Melvin joined the cast as Alex Norwood, her character has been described as a self-taught engineering prodigy who works alongside Jake Wells (Jerry MacKinnon) in the supernatural archives in Washington D.C. Jeremy Davies joined the cast in a recurring role as villain Malcolm Dreyfuss, a billionaire tech mogul who aspires to conquer other worlds, described as a dark mirror to Ichabod Crane. James Kyson joined the cast as Diana's boss. During the show's New York Comic Con panel on October 9, 2016, it was revealed that John Noble will be returning this season as Henry Parrish / Jeremy Crane; however, it was not revealed on whether he will be recurring or guest-starring in this season. On November 1, 2016, it was announced that Kamar de los Reyes will be starring in a recurring role this season. Robbie Kay was cast in the role of Logan MacDonald on November 23, 2016.

Due to the show changing its setting to Washington, D.C., it was announced that stars Lance Gross who played FBI Agent Daniel Reynolds, and Jessica Camacho who played FBI Agent Sophie Foster in Season 3 would not be returning. However, it was also teased that Camacho might make a few guest appearances in Season 4.

Filming
Production on the fourth season began on August 15, 2016 in Atlanta, Georgia. On October 11, 2016, it was reported that filming was taking place in the city of Lawrenceville, Georgia; pictures from the set of the show were also shared on social media.

Reception

Ratings

References

External links

2017 American television seasons